The 2010 Algarve Cup was the seventeenth edition of the Algarve Cup, an invitational women's football tournament held annually in Portugal. It took place between 24 February and 3 March 2010. It was won by the United States who defeated World and European champions Germany 3–2 in the final to extend their record of Algarve titles to seven. Sweden defeated China, 2-0, in the third prize game.

Format
The twelve invited teams were split into three groups that played a round-robin tournament.  The main eight entrants were identical to the previous year. Group C featured two different sides with Romania and the Faroe Islands replacing Poland and Wales.

Groups A and B, containing the strongest ranked teams, were the only ones in contention to win the title. The group winners from A and B contested the final, with the runners-up playing for third place and those that finished third in these two groups playing for fifth place.

The teams in Group C were playing for places 7–12, with the winner of Group C playing the team that finished fourth in Group A or B with the better record for seventh place and the Group C runner-up playing the team which came last in Group A or B with the worse record for ninth place. The third and fourth-placed teams in Group C played for eleventh place.

Points awarded in the group stage follow the standard formula of three points for a win, one point for a draw and zero points for a loss. In the case of two teams being tied on the same number of points in a group, their head-to-head result determined the higher place.

Teams
The twelve invited teams were:

Group stage
All times local (WET/UTC+0)

Group A

Group B

Group C

Note: Portugal and Romania drew lots to determine finishing positions

Placement play-offs
All times local (WET/UTC+0)

11th Place

9th Place

7th Place

5th Place

3rd Place

Final

References

Alg
Algarve Cup
2010
February 2010 sports events in Europe
March 2010 sports events in Europe
2010 in Portuguese women's sport